The University Women's Club, originally the University Club for Ladies, is a British private members club founded in 1883. As the popular gentlemen's clubs did not accept any women as members, its creation was intended to provide an equivalent club accessible to women. By its own definition, it is a club for "graduate and professional women of varied backgrounds and interests". Members include lawyers, scientists, writers and musicians, as well as businesswomen.

The club house is located at 2 Audley Square, on South Audley Street, Mayfair, London.

History
The University Club for Ladies was founded in 1883 by Gertrude Jackson of Girton College, Cambridge. In January 1887, it opened its premises at 31 Bond Street. By 1894, the location was not large enough to serve the purposes of the growing club and it expanded by moving to new premises at Maddox Street. By 1904, the club had moved to 4 George Street, Hanover Square, where a number of bedrooms were available and by 1913, membership had grown to 800 members. The club now has almost 1,000 members.

After the Great War, the club was again looking for new premises and, after a lengthy search, the freehold of 2 Audley Square – the club's permanent home today – was purchased in 1921.  At the same time, it adopted its current name, the University Women's Club.

The house was built by Lord Arthur Russell in about 1880 to house his large family: the architect was T. H. Wyatt. The terrace and garden are now planted with green, white and violet plants, the colours associated with the Suffragette movement.  A large London plane tree stands in the middle of the garden, probably originally planted in the grounds of Chesterfield House.

The Club today
Today, the University Women's Club is the only women's club in the UK to be wholly owned and managed by its Members.

Its event schedule includes many dinners and other social events.

In March 2014, Fiona Lazareff, a member of the committee, launched the annual Techpreneurs Awards on behalf of the club.

The Club has close ties with the East India Club, which occasionally co-organises functions for members of both clubs.

Members of the club pay an initial joining fee and an annual subscription.

Notable members

Gail Horton Calmerton
Caroline Playne

See also
List of London's gentlemen's clubs
East India Club

References

External links

1883 establishments in England
Buildings and structures in Mayfair
Gentlemen's clubs in London
Organizations established in 1883
Women in London
Women's clubs
Women's organisations based in England